Tíminn was an Icelandic daily newspaper founded in 1917. It had close ties with the Icelandic Progressive Party but after years of financial difficulties, the party severed all ties with the paper in 1993.

It merged with the newspaper Dagur in 1996, becoming Dagur-Tíminn. Its last edition came out on 28 August 1996.

References

External links
Published Issues at the National and University Library of Iceland

1917 establishments in Iceland
Publications established in 1917
Daily newspapers published in Iceland
Defunct newspapers published in Iceland
Mass media in Reykjavík
Publications disestablished in 1996